The doctrine of direct estoppel prevents a party to a litigation from relitigating an issue that was decided against that party. Specifically, direct estoppel applies where the issue was decided as part of a larger claim which was finally decided, and stops the issue from being introduced against in another claim of the same lawsuit. Direct estoppel is part of the larger doctrine of estoppel by judgment. Direct estoppel should not be confused with collateral estoppel. In criminal cases, collateral estoppel prevents a  defendant from facing the same charge in more than one criminal trial. In civil procedure, collateral estoppel prevents the re-litigation of an issue decided on the merits.

In Stone v. William Steinen Mfg. Co. the court decided that if there is a final and valid judgment, the cause of action cannot be sustain.

See also
Collateral estoppel
Res judicata

References

State v. Huskey, 66 S.W.3d 905,928 (Tenn.Crim.App. 2001), quoting U.S. v. Bailin, 977 F.2d 270, 276 (7th Cir. 1992).
https://opencasebook.org/casebooks/2985-civil-procedure-2021/resources/15.2.1.1-introduction-to-issue-preclusion/ 
https://repository.law.umich.edu/cgi/viewcontent.cgi?article=4278&context=mlr

Civil procedure
American legal terminology
Estoppel